Howard Cleveland (November 25, 1916 – August 13, 1970), nicknamed "Duke", was an American Negro league outfielder between 1938 and 1947.

A native of Alapaha, Georgia, Cleveland made his Negro leagues debut in 1938 with the Jacksonville Red Caps. He remained with the club through 1942, as the team moved to Cleveland and then back to Jacksonville. Cleveland went on to play for the Cleveland Buckeyes, returned to the Red Caps in 1944, and finished his career with the Indianapolis Clowns in 1946 and 1947. He died in Jacksonville, Florida in 1970 at age 53.

References

External links
 and Baseball-Reference Black Baseball stats and Seamheads

1916 births
1970 deaths
Cleveland Bears players
Cleveland Buckeyes players
Indianapolis Clowns players
Jacksonville Red Caps players
Baseball outfielders
Baseball players from Georgia (U.S. state)
20th-century African-American sportspeople